Ban'didhoo (Dhivehi: ބަނޑިދޫ) is one of the inhabited islands of Dhaalu Atoll.

History
Like other islands, Ban'didhoo was impacted by the 2004 tsunami with several casualties and massive infrastructure damage. However, the island has managed a full, albeit slow, recovery.

Geography

Demography

Economy
The commerce of the island is centered around their famous fleet of fishing boats (approx: 25). Although typically a fishing community, inhabitants have started working construction and resort jobs.

Services
Ban'didhoo has a hospital (Ban'didhoo Health Centre) and a school (Ban'didhoo School) teaching from preschool to grade 10. Ban'didhoo also has a guest house (iruveli inn) and a police station near the harbor. Ban'didhoo also has electricity 24/7 provided by Fenaka.co.

Transport
Ban'didhoo also has a harbour to enable faster loading and unloading for boats. The harbour development was begun on 10 March 2014. The expanded harbour was reopened by President Abdulla Yameen on 4 May 2016.

References

Islands of the Maldives